The 1995 World Series of Poker (WSOP) was a series of poker tournaments held at Binion's Horseshoe.

Preliminary events

Main Event
There were 273 entrants to the main event. Each paid $10,000 to enter the tournament. 1992 Main Event champion Hamid Dastmalchi made the final table looking for his second Main Event title but fell short.

Final table

*Career statistics prior to the beginning of the 1995 Main Event.

Final table results

Other High Finishes
NB: This list is restricted to top 28 finishers with an existing Wikipedia entry.

External links
 1995 World Series of Poker at Conjelco.com

World Series of Poker
World Series of Poker